RTS/CTS (request to send/ clear to send) may refer to:
 Request to Send and Clear to Send, flow control signals
RS-232 RTS/CTS, today's usual RS-232 hardware flow control
IEEE 802.11 RTS/CTS, wireless networking protocol flow control